Ela Gandhi (born 1 July 1940), is a South African peace activist and former politician. She served as a Member of Parliament in South Africa from 1994 to 2004, where she aligned with the African National Congress (ANC) party representing the Phoenix area of Inanda in the KwaZulu-Natal province. Her parliamentary committee assignments included the Welfare, and Public Enterprises committees as well as the ad hoc committee on Surrogate Motherhood. She was an alternate member of the Justice Committee and served on Theme Committee 5 on Judiciary and Legal Systems. She is the granddaughter of Mahatma Gandhi.

Early life
Ela Gandhi was born on 1 July 1940 in Durban, to Manilal Gandhi and Sushila Mashruwala. Her father was an editor of the Indian Opinion. Ela grew up in an ashram of the Phoenix Settlement. She received her B.A. degree at the former Natal University and later received a B.A. in social science with honors from UNISA.  Following graduation, she worked as a social worker with the Verulam Child and Family Welfare Society for 15 years and the Durban Indian Child and Family Welfare Society for five years.

Gandhi served as an executive member of the Natal Organisation of Women from its inception until 1991. Her political affiliations include the Natal Indian Congress, which she served as vice president, the United Democratic Front, Descom Crisis Network, and Inanda Support Committee.  During apartheid, Gandhi was banned in 1975 from political activism and subjected to house arrest for a total of nine years. She worked underground for an end to the practice. One of her sons was killed during the struggle against apartheid.  She was among the members of the United Democratic Front who met with Nelson Mandela prior to his release from Pollsmoor Prison on February 11, 1990. Prior to the 1994 elections, Gandhi was a member of the Transitional Executive Council.

Post parliament
After serving in parliament, Gandhi developed a 24-hour program against domestic violence, founded the Gandhi Development Trust, serves as a member of the Religious Affairs Committee, and oversees a monthly newspaper.  She also chairs the Mahatma Gandhi Salt March Committee and the Mahatma Gandhi Development Trust.  Ela Gandhi served as the Chancellor of Durban University of Technology for several years.

Awards and recognitions

Ela Gandhi's contribution to politics and society is widely recognised - 
 In 2002, she received the Community of Christ International Peace Award.
 In 2007, she was conferred the Padma Bhushan award from the Government of India.
 In 2013, she was awarded the Shanti Doot International Award - the honour for overseas Indians conferred by the World Peace Movement India.
 In 2014, she was awarded the Pravasi Bharatiya Samman - the highest honour for overseas Indians conferred by the President of India.
 In 2014, she was also honoured as a veteran of the Umkhonto we Sizwe.
The Embassy of India Student Hub, Washington, D.C., invited Ela Gandhi to speak to over 15,000 graduating students in the Class of 2020 during a virtual graduation ceremony.

See also

List of people subject to banning orders under apartheid

References

External links
Interview of Ela Gandhi September 25, 2001
History of South Africa biography 

1940 births
Living people
People from Durban
Anti-apartheid activists
South African people of Indian descent
Recipients of the Padma Bhushan in public affairs
Ela
Gandhians
African National Congress politicians
Members of the National Assembly of South Africa
Natal Indian Congress politicians
South African people of Gujarati descent
uMkhonto we Sizwe personnel
Women members of the National Assembly of South Africa
Recipients of Pravasi Bharatiya Samman